On August 14, 2006, a convoy carrying the Pakistani High Commissioner to Sri Lanka, Bashir Wali Mohamed, was attacked by a claymore antipersonnel mine concealed within an auto rickshaw. The High Commissioner escaped unhurt, but seven people (including four Army commandoes) were killed and a further seventeen injured in the blast.

No group claimed responsibility for the attack, but the Sri Lankan government blamed the LTTE. High Commissioner Mohamed claimed that India had carried it out, in order to intimidate Pakistan, which is one of the main suppliers of military equipment to the Sri Lankan government. Pakistan had promised one shipload of the wherewithal every 10 days in coming months.

A Sri Lankan military spokesman said, "Definitely it's an LTTE [Liberation Tigers of Tamil Eelam] attack to the Pakistan ambassador's car but they missed and the backup vehicle got caught." The Pakistani ambassador may be a target of the LTTE because Pakistan is a major backer of the Sri Lankan government.

Several LTTE suspects were arrested following the attack.

Sources

2006 crimes in Sri Lanka
Pakistani ambassador to Sri Lanka
Attacks on civilians attributed to the Liberation Tigers of Tamil Eelam
Attacks on diplomatic missions in Sri Lanka
Attacks on diplomatic missions of Pakistan
Liberation Tigers of Tamil Eelam attacks in Eelam War IV
Mass murder in 2006
Pakistan–Sri Lanka relations
Terrorist incidents in Sri Lanka in 2006
August 2006 events in Asia